Parklands High School is a coeducational secondary school with academy status located in Chorley, Lancashire, England. The school has been judged "good" with "outstanding" in the behaviour and safety of pupils, by Ofsted in February 2014. There are currently 1085 students on roll. The current headteacher, Mr S Mitchell, is the sixth headteacher of Parklands. He was appointed headteacher in 2017, when the previous headteacher, Mrs. Claire Hollister, retired from the school.

History

Grammar school
The current Parklands High School was originally called Chorley Grammar School. It was originally housed in buildings in Union Street, Chorley which is now home to the public library. It changed its name in 1972, when the school changed from a grammar school to a comprehensive school, to Parklands High School.

From 2003 to 2012, Parklands High School held a specialist language college status. Since 1962, the school badge reads Propositi Tenax, which translates to Firm of Purpose. The current motto of the school is Learn, Respect, Aspire, Achieve, which has been used since the school became an academy.

Buildings
The current school buildings were opened in 1959. This included the hall, concourse, south and north blocks and the gym. Several buildings have been erected since the school was first built. This includes the west block, which was built in 1970s, and is currently used as history, music and ICT classrooms.

The first major building work was the extension of the north block, which added four more English classrooms and two photography rooms, which are currently named as N01, N02, N14, N15, N24 and N25. This addition was constructed when Mr. Ray Landless was the headteacher of the school. The Science Blocks (L1/L2) were constructed in 1989.

There were two major building additions in the 2000s, a new art, RE, drama, and science block which replaced the previous block ROSLA, which was demolished, a new sports hall, and in 2010, an extension to the front of the building, to extend the dining area and reception. In addition students created a new outdoor social area.

Parklands was first made a Language College in 2003. In 2014, the Parklands Pavilion was opened after months of refurbishment. This building is currently used as dance studios, and is also used for assemblies.

In late 2020, the previous science block was renovated to create 8 new English classrooms named after influential authors throughout time. Additionally, four former English classrooms were refurbished; creating two new science suites.

Academy
Parklands High School converted to academy status in September 2012, meaning the school is now independent of local authority control.

Facilities
The school has its own all astro turf which is used for various PE activities. Extra buildings also include a pavilion, a sports hall, a gym, a fitness suite, and the original hall. All are available for pupil and staff use. New to 2021 there now includes a gender neutral toilets located outside of lower S-Wing

Notable former pupils

 Paul Grayson, England rugby player
 Tom Smith, currently with Lancashire County Cricket Club
 David Unsworth, former footballer, coach of Preston North End F.C.
 Holly Bradshaw, olympian
 Bethany Black, Comedian, Actor
 Yrsa Daley-Ward, poet, author, actor

References

External links
 Parklands High School Web Site
 Parklands High School Facilities

Schools in Chorley
Secondary schools in Lancashire
Educational institutions established in 1962
1962 establishments in England
Academies in Lancashire